Miguel Ángel Lozano Ayala (born 16 September 1978), known as Miguel Ángel, is a Spanish retired professional footballer who played as a defensive midfielder.

Over eight seasons, he amassed La Liga totals of 206 matches and eight goals, mainly representing Málaga (five years, two spells). He appeared in the Champions League with Betis.

Club career
Born in Sabadell, Barcelona, Catalonia, Miguel Ángel began his career at hometown's CE Sabadell FC, where he played during the 1995–96 season in the Segunda División B. He moved to neighbours FC Barcelona in 1996, spending some time with its C and B teams.

In summer 1999, Miguel Ángel signed for Levante UD, where he spent two years in the Segunda División. In the 2001–02 campaign he joined Málaga CF, being a key element in midfield during his five-year stay, scoring seven La Liga goals and helping the side to the 2002 UEFA Intertoto Cup.

For 2005–06, Miguel Ángel was transferred to Andalusia neighbours Real Betis in a deal worth €2 million, signing a five-year contract with the club. Early into his first season, he suffered ligament damage to his right knee in a UEFA Champions League group stage match against Chelsea at Stamford Bridge, a 4–0 loss.

Miguel Ángel returned to Levante in July 2007 on a one-year loan, being released at the end of the campaign and subsequently rejoining Málaga. After being relatively used in the first season in his second spell, he was loaned to Gimnàstic de Tarragona in division two.

On 13 July 2010, Miguél Ángel was released by Málaga. Two weeks later, at nearly 32, he signed a one-year contract with SD Ponferradina, recently returned to the second tier; in the following transfer window, however, he was released.

Miguel Ángel then spent three years in the lower leagues, with CF Badalona, CD Castellón and Terrassa FC. He moved abroad for the first time on 28 May 2015, becoming player-manager of FC Ordino in Andorra's Primera Divisió.

Honours
Málaga
UEFA Intertoto Cup: 2002

References

External links

1978 births
Living people
Sportspeople from Sabadell
Spanish footballers
Footballers from Catalonia
Association football midfielders
La Liga players
Segunda División players
Segunda División B players
Tercera División players
CE Sabadell FC B players
CE Sabadell FC footballers
FC Barcelona C players
FC Barcelona Atlètic players
Levante UD footballers
Málaga CF players
Real Betis players
Gimnàstic de Tarragona footballers
SD Ponferradina players
CF Badalona players
CD Castellón footballers
Terrassa FC footballers
Catalonia international footballers
Spanish expatriate footballers
Expatriate footballers in Andorra
Spanish expatriate sportspeople in Andorra
Spanish football managers
Spanish expatriate football managers
Expatriate football managers in Andorra